Võ Trọng Nghĩa is a Vietnamese architect.

Career
Võ Trọng Nghĩa studied architecture at the Nagoya Institute of Technology and the University of Tokyo, earning his MA.
Back in Vietnam he established Võ Trọng Nghĩa Architects in 2006. Võ developed sustainable architectural design by integrating inexpensive, local materials and traditional skills with contemporary aesthetics and modern methodologies.

Awards

  World Architecture Festival 2014 - Winner of "House", "Hotel & Leisure" and "Education Future Projects" categories 
 ARCASIA Building of the Year 2014 
 WAN 21 for 21 Awards 2012 
 Vietnamese Architect of the Year 2012 (Ashui Awards)

Selected projects

Some of his best-known works are the Vietnam Pavilion for the Milan Expo 2015, the Farming Kindergarten, in Dong Nai, Vietnam and the House for Trees, in Ho Chi Minh City, Vietnam.

References

External links
 Vo Trong Nghia Architects

Living people
Vietnamese architects
University of Tokyo alumni
1976 births